Thomas Potter may refer to:

Thomas Potter (Universalist) (1689–1777), one founder of the Universalist Church in America
Thomas Bayley Potter (1817–1898), British MP for Rochdale
Thomas Rossell Potter (1799–1873), geologist and writer about Leicestershire
Thomas Potter (died 1759) (1718–1759), British MP for Aylesbury, Okehampton and St Germans
Thomas Potter (1740–1801), British MP for Lostwithiel
Thomas Potter (mayor) (1774–1845), mayor of Manchester, England, father of Thomas Bayley Potter
Tom Potter (born 1940), mayor of Portland, Oregon, United States
Tommy Potter (1918–1988), jazz double bass player
Thomas Joseph Potter (1828–1873), English Catholic convert, educator and hymn writer
Thomas J. Potter (1840–1888), vice-president and general manager of the Union Pacific Railroad
Tom Potter (brewer), co-founder of Brooklyn Brewery
Thomas Potter (cricketer) (1844–1909), English cricketer
Thomas Potter (industrialist) (1745–1811), Scottish-born Danish industrialist and merchant